Palaniappan may refer to:

 21715 Palaniappan, a main-belt asteroid
 B. Palaniappan (1930–2014), Indian gynaecologist
 K. L. Palaniappan, Malaysian businessman
 Karu Pazhaniappan is an Indian film director
 P. Palaniappan, Indian politician, Member of the Legislative Assembly of Tamil Nadu
 S. M. Palaniappan (born 1930), former Member of the Legislative Assembly of Tamil Nadu
 P. Chidambaram or Chidambaram Palaniappan (born 1945), Indian politician with the Indian National Congress and former Union Minister of Home Affairs
 Murugan Pal or Murugan Palaniappan (1966–2012), Silicon Valley entrepreneur